Dayanand Prajapati, (born 30 June 1969), or Bhajan Samrat/Sangeet Samrat Sri Dayanand prajapati ji, is a famous religious singer.

He is an Indian Director/poet/musician/singer, best known for his performances in the Religional music, the bhajans and the Religious form of poetry. He is also known as kirtan samrat for his different kind of music.

Early life
Dayanand Prajapati was born in Hapur, Uttar Pradesh. He was educated in Lucknow, Uttar Pradesh.

Career
Prajapati started his musical career as a local Kirtan singer. He took his musical education from Sri Pulask Guruji  from 1982 to 1985 and then worked on many albums and open theatres and open music contests. He has recorded about 200 bhajans and kirtans for companies like Moserbaer, Sonic, T-Series etc. He had written poems for different  religious magazines and journals.

Discography
 Mera Sanwariya Dildar
 Ma Humko Shakti do

References

Indian male singer-songwriters
Indian singer-songwriters
1971 births
Living people
Bhajan singers
Performers of Hindu music
Singers from Uttar Pradesh